The Gospel of John is a 2014 biblical film directed by David Batty with Selva Rasalingam in the role of Jesus. The film is an adaption of the Gospel of John, the fourth book of the New Testament in the Christian Bible.

The film was initially released on Netflix and then on DVD., it can also be streamed online from Amazon  There is a narration from the New International Version English Bible and there is secondary narration of the Gospel of John read by actor Brian Cox from the King James Version English Bible.

The cast includes Mourad Zaoui, El Mahmoudi M'Barek, Karima Gouit, Goutou Hicham. Cinematography by Ben Hodgson. The Gospel of John is one of four Gospel films produced by the Lumo Project.

See also
 The Gospel of John a 2003 word-for-word film adaptation

References

External links
 

 Lumo project website
 Lumo project on Vimeo

2014 films
British epic films
Religious epic films
Gospel of John
Films about Jesus
Cultural depictions of John the Baptist
Portrayals of the Virgin Mary in film
Films set in Jerusalem
Portrayals of Mary Magdalene in film
2010s British films